Bernadine Oliver-Kerby (born 14 June 1971) is a New Zealand broadcaster who formerly co-hosted (until December 2019) the breakfast show alongside Jason Reeves  on Coast. She has previously worked as a newsreader for both ONE News  and Newstalk ZB.

Previously she worked as a sports reporter and was the co-anchor of One News and a fill-in for other bulletins during the week, including One News at 6pm and Breakfast and late news. She co-anchored One News with Peter Williams. Between February and March 2006 she presented TV Two's New Zealand's Brainiest Kid. Oliver-Kerby also appeared in the TV One documentary, Intrepid Journeys. Her episode documented the lives of the people in Croatia. 

She was announced to replace Barry Holland as the Newsreader for the Paul Holmes Breakfast, later the Mike Hosking Breakfast. She first began this role in 2005 and won Newsreader of the Year at the NZ Radio Awards. that year.  In October 2007, she went on maternity leave, leaving her job to Kate Hawkesby. Since her return she had been working part-time on this radio slot. In July 2009, she took maternity leave for her second child. From 25 March she returned to the role full-time.
She hosted Skoda Game On and Skoda Game On Extra Time with Rod Cheeseman, a show talking, debating and joking sport.
She won Newsreader of the Year at the New Zealand Radio Awards 2016.

In 2020 she joined Sky Sports New Zealand, and in 2022 she The AM Show alongside Ryan Bridge, Melissa Chan-Green and William Waiirua.

In 2022 she announced that she was suffering from Bell's palsy.

See also
 List of New Zealand television personalities

References

New Zealand television presenters
New Zealand women television presenters
1971 births
Living people
People from Hamilton, New Zealand
Newstalk ZB